Love Bound is a 1932 American Pre-Code mystery film directed by Robert F. Hill and starring Jack Mulhall, Natalie Moorhead, Clara Kimball Young. It is a second feature produced by the Poverty Row studio Peerless Pictures. The film is also known as Murder on the High Seas, the alternative title it was later reissued under.

Synopsis
Gold-digging actress Verna Wilson demands money from a financial theatrical backer by falsely threatening to tell his wife that their relationship is more than professional. After he pays up his son Dick discovers that Verna is part of a gang of blackmailers and is now fleeing the country on an ocean liner. He boards the ship along with his chauffeur and the two pose as wealthy playboys in order that Verna will attempt to play the same trick on them. Dick and Verna instead fall in love, but things are complicated by the presence of her associates on board the ship, leading to a murder.

Cast
Jack Mulhall as Richard "Dick" Randolph, posing as Dick Rowland
Natalie Moorhead as Verna Wilson, alias Vera Wendall
Clara Kimball Young as Mrs. Jane Randolph
Edmund Breese as J.B. "Lucky" Morrison
Tom Ricketts as The Baron
Alice Day as Claudia Elliott
William V. Mong as Verna's Crooked Lawyer
Montagu Love as John Randolph
Richard Alexander as Larry, the Randolph Chauffeur, posing as J. B. "Lucky" Morrison
Roy D'Arcy as Juan de Leon
Lynton Brent as Jimmy Wilson
 Sidney Bracey as 	Spriggins
 Gordon De Main as Flynn - Private Detective 
 Robert F. Hill as Ship Passenger
 Olaf Hytten as 	Ship Passenger 
 William H. O'Brien as 	Butler

References

Bibliography
 Pitts, Michael R. Poverty Row Studios, 1929–1940: An Illustrated History of 55 Independent Film Companies, with a Filmography for Each. McFarland & Company, 2005.

External links 

1932 films
1932 drama films
American mystery drama films
1930s English-language films
American black-and-white films
Films directed by Robert F. Hill
1930s mystery drama films
Seafaring films
1930s American films